The Mitsubishi AAM-1 was a Japanese infrared homing air-to-air missile developed from the AIM-9B Sidewinder missile.

Operational history
Starting in 1969, the AAM-1 was produced by Mitsubishi Heavy Industries, with around 400 produced in total. It served as the standard armament for Japan Air Self-Defense Force F-104J while used on North American F-86F and Mitsubishi F-1. Being slightly shorter and lighter compared to the AIM-9E Sidewinder, the AAM-1 had inferior performances compared to the American missile which was entering service in Japan. The unit cost of an AIM-9B purchased through Foreign Military Sales was about 1 million yen, while that of AAM-1 was about 3.5 million yen in 1968 and about 4.19 million yen in 1969. Due to higher cost and inferior characteristics, the procurement of the AAM-1 was halted in 1972  with the last examples withdrawn for service in 1986.

Operators
  - Japan Air Self-Defense Force

See also
AAM-2
AAM-3
AAM-4
AAM-5
AIM-9 Sidewinder
K-13 (missile)
R-60 (missile)
R.550 Magic
Shafrir-1

References

Air-to-air missiles of Japan
Military equipment introduced in the 1960s